Empirical dynamic modeling (EDM) is a framework for analysis and prediction of nonlinear dynamical systems. Applications include population dynamics, ecosystem service, medicine, neuroscience, dynamical systems, geophysics, and human-computer interaction. EDM was originally developed by Robert May and George Sugihara.  It can be considered a methodology for data modeling, predictive analytics, dynamical system analysis, machine learning and time series analysis.

Description
Mathematical models have tremendous power to describe observations of real-world systems. They are routinely used to test hypothesis, explain mechanisms and predict future outcomes. However, real-world systems are often nonlinear and multidimensional, in some instances rendering explicit equation-based modeling problematic. Empirical models, which infer patterns and associations from the data instead of using hypothesized equations, represent a natural and flexible framework for modeling complex dynamics.

Donald DeAngelis and Simeon Yurek illustrated that canonical statistical models are ill-posed when applied to nonlinear dynamical systems. A hallmark of nonlinear dynamics is state-dependence: system states are related to previous states governing transition from one state to another.  EDM operates in this space, the multidimensional state-space of system dynamics rather than on one-dimensional observational time series.  EDM does not presume relationships among states, for example, a functional dependence, but projects future states from localised, neighboring states. EDM is thus a state-space, nearest-neighbors paradigm where system dynamics are inferred from states derived from observational time series. This provides a model-free representation of the system naturally encompassing nonlinear dynamics.

A cornerstone of EDM is recognition that time series observed from a dynamical system can be transformed into higher-dimensional state-spaces by time-delay embedding with Takens's theorem.  The state-space models are evaluated based on in-sample fidelity to observations, conventionally with Pearson correlation between predictions and observations.

Methods
EDM is continuing to evolve. As of 2022, the main algorithms are Simplex projection, Sequential locally weighted global linear maps (S-Map) projection, Multivariate embedding in Simplex or S-Map, 
Convergent cross mapping (CCM), 
and Multiview Embeding, described below.

Nearest neighbors are found according to:

Simplex
Simplex projection is a nearest neighbor projection. It locates the  nearest neighbors to the location in the state-space from which a prediction is desired. To minimize the number of free parameters  is typically set to  defining an  dimensional simplex in the state-space. The prediction is computed as the average of the weighted phase-space simplex projected  points ahead. Each neighbor is weighted proportional to their distance to the projection origin vector in the state-space.

 Find  nearest neighbor:  
 Define the distance scale: 
 Compute weights: For{} : 
 Average of state-space simplex:

S-Map
S-Map extends the state-space prediction in Simplex from an average of the  nearest neighbors to a linear regression fit to all neighbors, but localised with an exponential decay kernel. This localisation ability allows one to identify an optimal local scale, in-effect quantifying the degree of state dependence, and hence nonlinearity of the system.

Another feature of S-Map is that for a properly fit model, the regression coefficients between variables have been shown to approximate the gradient (directional derivative) of variables along the manifold. These Jacobians represent the time-varying interaction strengths between system variables.

 Find  nearest neighbor:  
 Sum of distances: 
 Compute weights: For{} : 
 Reweighting matrix: 
 Design matrix: 
 Weighted design matrix: 
 Response vector at : 
 Weighted response vector: 
 Least squares solution (SVD): 
 Local linear model  is prediction:

Multivariate Embedding
Multivariate Embedding recognizes that time-delay embeddings are not the only valid state-space construction.  In Simplex and S-Map one can generate a state-space from observational vectors, or time-delay embeddings of a single observational time series, or both.

Convergent Cross Mapping
Convergent cross mapping (CCM) leverages a corollary to the Generalized Takens Theorem that it should be possible to cross predict or cross map between variables  observed from the same system.

If the prediction skill of  increases and saturates as the entire  is used, this provides evidence that  is casually influencing .

Multiview Embedding
Multiview Embedding is a Dimensionality reduction technique where a large number of state-space time series vectors are combitorially assessed towards maximal model predictability.

Extensions
Extensions to EDM techniques include:
 Generalized Theorems for Nonlinear State Space Reconstruction
 Extended Convergent Cross Mapping
 Dynamic stability
 S-Map regularization
 Visual analytics with EDM
 Convergent Cross Sorting
 Expert system with EDM hybrid
 Sliding windows based on the extended convergent cross-mapping
 Empirical Mode Modeling
 Variable step sizes with bundle embedding
 Multiview distance regularised S-map

See also 
 System dynamics
 Complex dynamics
 Nonlinear dimensionality reduction

References

Further reading

External links
Arxiv preprint server has daily submissions of (non-refereed) manuscripts in dynamical systems.

Online books or lecture notes
EDM Introduction. Introduction with video, examples and references.
Geometrical theory of dynamical systems. Nils Berglund's lecture notes for a course at ETH at the advanced undergraduate level.

Research groups
Sugihara Lab, Scripps Institution of Oceanography, University of California San Diego.

Nonlinear systems
Data modeling
Predictive analytics
Machine learning
Nonlinear time series analysis